William Davy (1743–1826), was an English divine.

Davy graduated with a B.A. from Balliol College, Oxford in 1766. He was vicar of Winkleigh, Devonshire from 1825 to 1826. Davy wrote  A System of Divinity on the Being, Nature, and Attributes of God which he printed himself.

References

1743 births
1826 deaths
English theologians
English Christian religious leaders
Alumni of Balliol College, Oxford
People from Winkleigh